Taragarh is an abandoned village in Salon block of Rae Bareli district, Uttar Pradesh, India. As of 2011, Taragarh is uninhabited, although the land is used for agricultural purposes.

The 1961 census recorded Taragarh as comprising 1 hamlet, with a total population of 87 people (42 male and 45 female), in 21 households and 20 physical houses. The area of the village was given as 68 acres.

The 1981 census recorded Taragarh as having a population of 0 and an area of 27.93 hectares.

References 

Villages in Raebareli district
Former villages